Hespérides Point is a rocky point of land projecting into South Bay north-northwest of Johnsons Dock, Livingston Island in the South Shetland Islands, Antarctica and forming the southwest side of the entrance to Emona Anchorage.  Surmounted by Hesperides Hill.  The area was visited by 19th century sealers operating from nearby Johnsons Dock.

The feature is named after the Spanish ocean exploration ship BIO Hesperides.

Location

Maps 
 Isla Livingston: Península Hurd. Mapa topográfico de escala 1:25 000.  Madrid: Servicio Geográfico del Ejército, 1991.
 L.L. Ivanov. Livingston Island: Central-Eastern Region. Scale 1:25000 topographic map.  Sofia: Antarctic Place-names Commission of Bulgaria, 1996.
 L.L. Ivanov et al. Antarctica: Livingston Island and Greenwich Island, South Shetland Islands. Scale 1:100000 topographic map. Sofia: Antarctic Place-names Commission of Bulgaria, 2005.
 L.L. Ivanov. Antarctica: Livingston Island and Greenwich, Robert, Snow and Smith Islands. Scale 1:120000 topographic map.  Troyan: Manfred Wörner Foundation, 2009.  
 Antarctica, South Shetland Islands, Livingston Island: Bulgarian Antarctic Base. Sheets 1 and 2. Scale 1:2000 topographic map. Geodesy, Cartography and Cadastre Agency, 2016. (in Bulgarian)

References
 SCAR Composite Antarctic Gazetteer

Headlands of Livingston Island
Spain and the Antarctic